Ruan Xiao'er, also known as Ruan the Second, is a fictional character in Water Margin, one of the Four Great Classical Novels in Chinese literature. Nicknamed "Tai Sui Who Stands His Ground", he ranks 27th among the 36 Heavenly Spirits, the first third of the 108 Stars of Destiny.

Background
The novel depicts Ruan Xiao'er as muscular and having a chiseled face, a wide mouth, a cold gleam in his eyes and some yellow hair on his chest. He is the elder brother of Ruan Xiaowu and Ruan Xiaoqi. They live in Shijie Village (石碣村; in present-day Liangshan County, Shandong), where they make a living by fishing in waters around the Liangshan Marsh. All three are good swimmers and fight well in water. Of the three, Ruan Xiao'er is the only one married with children.

Becoming an outlaw
Wu Yong recommends involving the three Ruan brothers when Chao Gai, headman of Dongxi village in Yuncheng County, seeks his advice on whether to hijack valuables in transportation to the Grand Tutor Cai Jing in the imperial capital Dongjing. Visiting the Ruans in Shijie Village, Wu claims that he has come to buy some fish before proceeding to find out whether they are receptive to the proposal. Ruan Xiaoer, being the oldest and most astute, senses Wu is up to something else. The other two are straightforward and quickly reveal resentment of their poverty and oppression by officials. Although less forthcoming, when Wu Yong comes to his point, Ruan Xiao-er accepts the invitation like his brothers. The robbers, numbering seven including Liu Tang and Gongsun Sheng and with the help of Bai Sheng, who poses as a wine seller, succeed in seizing the valuables at the Yellow Mud Ridge by drugging the escorts of the gifts led by Yang Zhi. 

But the authorities soon track down essential clues and an arrest party is sent to seize Chao Gai at his house. Chao, Wu Yong, Gongsun Sheng and Liu Tang flee to Shijie village. The Ruan brothers, familiar with the surrounding waters, lure the soldiers who have come for them into the waterways and wipe them out. The seven men then seek refuge in the bandit stronghold of Liangshan Marsh.

Wang Lun, the leader of Liangshan, tries to send them away with gifts fearing that they might usurp his position. Wu Yong, sensing Lin Chong's unhappiness with Wang, instigates him to kill the leader. Chao Gai is then elected the new chief of Liangshan, with Ruan Xiao'er taking the sixth position.

Ruan Xiao'er puts his skill in water combat to good use in many battles. When Ling Zhen helps Huyan Zhuo, who is sent by the Song court to stamp out the outlaws, by shelling Liangshan with cannons, Song Jiang is anxious to have this threat quickly nipped. The Ruan brothers, swimming under water, stole up to Ling's artillery platform set by the bank, overturn it and lured Ling to chase after them into the marsh where they capture him. Ling Zhen joins Liangshan and later contributes to creating panic among Huyan's chain-linked armoured cavalry with the firing of cannons.

Campaigns and death
Ruan Xiao'er is appointed as one of the commander of the Liangshan flotilla after the 108 Stars of Destiny came together in what is called the Grand Assembly. He participates in campaigns against the Liao invaders and rebel forces in Song territory following amnesty from Emperor Huizong for the Liangshan outlaws.

In the battle of Black Dragon Ridge (烏龍嶺; northeast of present-day Meicheng Town, Jiande, Zhejiang) in the campaign against Fang La, Ruan Xiao'er is sent to destroy the enemy's flotilla base. Fang's force bombard Ruan's boat with heavy cannon, trapping him in a sea of fire. Ruan Xiao'er dives into the water to escape but enemy soldiers snare him with hooks. Fearing being captured, he slits his own throat.

References
 
 
 
 
 
 
 

36 Heavenly Spirits
Fictional fishers
Fictional characters from Shandong